The discography of American singer Brooke Valentine consists of one studio album, one mixtape, one EP and seven singles.

Albums

Studio albums

Mixtapes

EPs

Singles

As featured artist

Promotional singles

Music videos

References

Discographies of American artists
Rhythm and blues discographies
Hip hop discographies